The Mayo Clinic Health System Event Center is a 5,280-seat (8,200 for concerts) multi-purpose arena in Mankato, Minnesota, built in 1994 and opened in early 1995. It is home to the Minnesota State Mavericks men's ice hockey team and women's ice hockey team, and also hosts musical performances, conventions and other events. Prior to its construction, the team played their home games at All Seasons Arena, which is now their main practice facility.

Until April 1, 2019, the arena's naming sponsor was Verizon Communications, one of America's major telecommunications companies.

History
In the 1992 general election, Mankato voters approved a 0.5% tax increment to support downtown renovations, including construction of a new sports arena. Construction began in 1994, and the facility opened as the Mankato Civic Center in 1995 with a men's hockey event on February 3. The south side of the complex incorporates the restored exterior of the First National Bank of Mankato, a 1913 Prairie School building.

In 1999, locally headquartered phone company Midwest Wireless purchased the naming rights, changing the venue's name to the Midwest Wireless Civic Center.

In July 2007, the facility's name changed to the Alltel Center following Alltel's acquisition of Midwest Wireless. Alltel paid $110,000 per year for naming rights.

In 2009, the name changed again, this time to the Verizon Wireless Center, after Alltel was acquired by Verizon Wireless.

In 2015, an expansion of the facility began with the purchase and demolition of the adjacent US Bank building. Construction was completed the following year, and the additional space with room for up to 2,000 more people opened on September 1, 2016. The name of the new facility was originally intended to be the Event Center, but prior to opening the City of Mankato decided to call it the Performing Arts Center instead to better reflect the anticipated usage primarily for musical and theatrical events.

In 2017, Verizon dropped "Wireless" from the name and the facility became simply the Verizon Center. The Performing Arts Center was also renamed the Grand Hall later in the year.

In March 2019, it was announced that Verizon would not be renewing its naming rights agreement. On April 1, 2019, the facility's name reverted to Mankato Civic Center, and remained so through the end of the year.

On December 30, 2019, the City of Mankato announced a new naming rights agreement with Mayo Clinic Health Systems effective January 1, 2020.

Events
Primarily, the center hosts hockey games, concerts and conventions.

Notable past artists and events include Aerosmith, Disney Live, Elton John, James Taylor, Jeff Dunham, John Mellencamp, Kenny Rogers, KISS, Monster Jam, Tom Petty, Weird Al Yankovic and WWE Live.

References

External links
Mayo Clinic Health System Event Center - official site

Indoor arenas in Minnesota
College ice hockey venues in the United States
Sports venues in Minnesota
Verizon Wireless
Minnesota State Mavericks ice hockey
Mankato, Minnesota
Sports venues completed in 1995
Indoor ice hockey venues in Minnesota
Minnesota Havok
1995 establishments in Minnesota